Dactylosporangium darangshiense is a bacterium from the genus Dactylosporangium which has been isolated from rock soil from the Darangshi Oreum mountain in Korea.

References

 

Micromonosporaceae
Bacteria described in 2010